Paul Matthijs (born 5 October 1976 in Paterswolde) is a Dutch footballer.

Career

Netherlands
Matthijs started his football career with VV Actief. On 20 August 1997, Matthijs made his debut against FC Volendam as a substitute in the 80th minute. Then, he was only 20 years old. After three seasons playing regularly for FC Groningen, AZ Alkmaar signed him. His time at AZ was not successful, and after a disappointing season, he returned to FC Groningen. In the 2005–06 Eredivisie season, he also reached European football with his side. He left Groningen in 2009 to join Eerste Divisie team BV Veendam.

Canada
On May 6, 2010 Matthijs signed a contract for FC Edmonton, a new club preparing to enter the North American second division in 2011. After playing for the team during its 2010 exhibition season he signed a new contract with Edmonton for the 2011 season, its first in the North American Soccer League, on February 28, 2011. He made his debut for Edmonton on May 7, 2011, in a game against the Atlanta Silverbacks. The club released Matthijis on October 12, 2011 after the conclusion of the 2011 season.

References

External links
 FC Edmonton profile
 VI profile

1976 births
Living people
People from Tynaarlo
Dutch footballers
Dutch expatriate footballers
FC Groningen players
AZ Alkmaar players
SC Veendam players
Eredivisie players
Eerste Divisie players
FC Edmonton players
North American Soccer League players
Expatriate soccer players in Canada
Association football midfielders
Dutch expatriate sportspeople in Canada
Footballers from Drenthe